The Bishop of Grahamstown is the Ordinary of the Diocese of Grahamstown in the Anglican Church of Southern Africa.
The Bishop's residence is Bishopsbourne, Grahamstown

List of Bishops of Grahamstown

Diocesan bishops 

 John Armstrong, D.D. 1853-1856
 Henry Cotterill,  M.A., D.D. 1856-1871 (Later bishop of Edinburgh)
 Nathaniel James Merriman, D.D. 1871-1882
 Allan Becher Webb, D.D. 1883-1898 (Later dean of Salisbury, England)
 Charles Edward Cornish, D.D. 1899-1915
 Francis Robinson Phelps, D.D. 1915-1931 (Later Archbishop of Cape Town)
 Archibald Howard Cullen, M.A. 1931-1959
 Robert Selby Taylor, M.A., D.D. 1959-1964 (Later archbishop of Cape Town)
 Gordon Leslie Tindall, B.A. 1964-1969
 Bill Bendyshe Burnett, M.A. L.Th. 1969-1974 (Later archbishop of Cape Town)
 Kenneth Cyril Oram, B.A., A.K.C. 1974-1987 (Later assistant bishop of Lichfield)
 David Patrick Hamilton Russell, M.A., Ph.D. 1987-2004
 Thabo Cecil Makgoba, B.Sc. B.A. (Hons) MEd Ph.D. 2004-2007 (LaterArchbishop of Cape Town)
 Ebenezer St Mark Ntlali, Dip.Th. B.A. (Hons) B.Th. 2007–present

Bishops suffragan 

The following were bishops suffragan in the diocese:

 Eric Pike, P.T.C., Dip.Th. 1989-1993 (Later bishop of Port Elizabeth)
 Anthony Mdletshe, L.Th., M.Div. 1993-1997 (Later bishop of Zululand)
 Bethlehem Nopece, Dip.Th. B.Th. M.Th. 1998-2002 (Later bishop of Port Elizabeth)
 Thabo Cecil Makgoba, B.Sc. B.A. (Hons) MEd.(Psychology) Ph.D. 2002-2004 (afterwards bishop of Grahamstown)

References 

Makhanda, Eastern Cape
Grahamstown
Eastern Cape-related lists